Kilian Senkbeil (born 22 May 1999) is a German footballer who plays as a centre-back, for SGV Freiberg in the fourth tier of German football.  He came through the youth development program of Bayern Munich II.

Career
Senkbeil made his professional debut for Bayern Munich II in the 3. Liga on 20 July 2019, starting in the away match against Würzburger Kickers.

Senkbeil's contract was not extended at the conclusion of the 2020-2021 season and he became a free agent.  On 12 November 2021, he was signed as a free agent by ZFC Meuselwitz.  At the conclusion of the 2021-2022 season, he moved to Latvia to join Virsliga side FK Auda.  After the conclusion of the Latvian season, and on the final day of the winter transfer window on 31 January 2023, Senkbeil joined Regionalliga side SGV Freiberg.

Career statistics

Club

References

External links
 
 Profile at DFB.de
 Profile at kicker.de

1999 births
Living people
Footballers from Leipzig
German footballers
Germany youth international footballers
Association football central defenders
FC Bayern Munich II players
3. Liga players
Regionalliga players